This is a list of electoral divisions in Greater London that existed from 1 April 1965 for elections to the Greater London Council until 1 April 1986 when that authority was disbanded. When Greater London was created, Parliamentary constituencies straddled the boundary so it was not possible to use these areas for election of councillors. Until new constituencies were drawn by the Boundary Commission nationally, the London boroughs were used as 32 multiple-member electoral divisions, with the City of London and London Borough of Westminster treated as though they were one London borough. The divisions altogether returned 100 Greater London councillors and from 1973, returned 92. A successor body with modified powers was created in 2000, the Mayor of London and London Assembly and its divisions are London Assembly constituencies, with a form of proportional representation used.

First series
It was planned to use Westminster Parliament constituencies as electoral areas for Greater London, as had been the practice for elections to the predecessor London County Council, but those that existed in 1965 crossed the Greater London boundary. Until new constituencies could be settled, the London boroughs were used as electoral areas. Westminster was joined with the City of London for this purpose. 32 electoral areas were used for the elections in 1964, 1967 and 1970. They were 'winner takes all' multiple member electoral areas using first-past-the-post voting. 100 councillors were elected in total. The Second Periodic Review of Westminster constituencies reported in 1969, but was not implemented in time for the 1970 election. The number of councillors elected for each electoral division is shown.

 Barking, 2
 Barnet, 4
 Bexley, 3
 Brent, 3
 Bromley, 4
 Camden, 3
 Croydon, 4
 Ealing, 4
 Enfield, 3
 Greenwich, 3
 Hackney, 3
 Hammersmith, 3
 Haringey, 3
 Harrow, 3
 Havering, 3
 Hillingdon, 3
 Hounslow, 3
 Islington, 3
 Kensington and Chelsea, 3
 Kingston upon Thames, 2
 Lambeth, 4
 Lewisham, 4
 Merton, 2
 Newham, 3
 Redbridge, 3
 Richmond upon Thames, 2
 Southwark, 4
 Sutton, 2
 Tower Hamlets, 2
 Waltham Forest, 3
 Wandsworth, 4
 Westminster and the City of London, 4

Second series
92 electoral divisions were used for the elections in 1973, 1977 and 1981. They were defined as electoral areas by statutory instrument on 20 June 1972 and were renamed electoral divisions by the Local Government Act 1972 later that year. Each electoral division returned one councillor using first-past-the-post voting. These areas were identical to the Westminster constituencies from 1974 to 1983 that had been defined in 1970.  92 councillors were elected in total. The electoral divisions were abolished with the Greater London Council in 1986.

Acton
Barking
Battersea North
Battersea South
Beckenham
Bermondsey
Bethnal Green and Bow
Bexleyheath
Brent East
Brent North
Brent South
Brentford and Isleworth
Carshalton
Chelsea
Chingford
Chipping Barnet
Chislehurst	
City of London and Westminster South
Croydon Central
Croydon North East
Croydon North West
Croydon South
Dagenham
Deptford
Dulwich
Ealing North
Edmonton
Enfield North
Erith and Crayford
Feltham and Heston
Finchley
Fulham
Greenwich
Hackney Central
Hackney North and Stoke Newington
Hackney South and Shoreditch
Hammersmith North
Hampstead
Harrow Central
Harrow East
Harrow West
Hayes and Harlington
Hendon North
Hendon South
Holborn and St Pancras South
Hornchurch
Hornsey
Ilford North
Ilford South
Islington Central
Islington North
Islington South and Finsbury
Kensington
Kingston upon Thames
Lambeth Central
Lewisham East
Lewisham West
Leyton
Mitcham and Morden
Newham North East
Newham North West
Newham South
Norwood
Orpington
Paddington
Peckham
Putney
Ravensbourne
Richmond upon Thames
Romford
Ruislip Northwood
St Marylebone
St Pancras North
Sidcup
Southall
Southgate
Stepney and Poplar
Streatham
Surbiton
Sutton and Cheam
Tooting
Tottenham
Twickenham
Upminster
Uxbridge
Vauxhall
Walthamstow
Wanstead and Woodford
Wimbledon
Wood Green
Woolwich East
Woolwich West

See also
List of electoral wards in Greater London
List of London Assembly constituencies
List of parliamentary constituencies in London

References

Greater London Council
London politics-related lists